Jon Faddis (born July 24, 1953) is an American jazz trumpet player, conductor, composer, and educator, renowned for both his playing and for his expertise in the field of music education. Upon his first appearance on the scene, he became known for his ability to closely mirror the sound of trumpet icon Dizzy Gillespie, who was his mentor along with pianist Stan Kenton and trumpeter Bill Catalano.

Biography
Jon Faddis was born in Oakland, California, United States. At 18, he joined Lionel Hampton's big band before joining the Thad Jones/Mel Lewis Orchestra as lead trumpet. After playing with Charles Mingus in his early twenties, Faddis became a noted studio musician in New York City, appearing on many pop recordings in the late 1970s and early 1980s.

One such recording was the Players Association's cover of "Disco Inferno", from their LP Born to Dance (1977), on which he plays trumpet. In the mid-1980s, he left the studios to continue to pursue his solo career, which resulted in albums such as Legacy (1985), Into the Faddisphere (1989) and Hornucopia (1991). He became the director and main trumpet soloist of the Dizzy Gillespie 70th Birthday Big Band and Dizzy's United Nation Orchestra.

From 1992 to 2002, Faddis led the Carnegie Hall Jazz Band (CHJB) at Carnegie Hall, conducting more than 40 concerts in ten years, during which time the CHJB presented over 135 musicians, featured over 70 guest artists, and premiered works by over 35 composers and arrangers at Carnegie Hall.

In 1997, Faddis composed the jazz opera Lulu Noire, which was presented at USA in Charleston, South Carolina, as well as at the American Music Theater Festival in Philadelphia. 

Faddis appeared in the 1998 movie Blues Brothers 2000, playing trumpet with the Louisiana Gator Boys.

In 1999, Faddis released the Grammy Award-nominated Remembrances (Chesky Records), which was composed almost entirely of ballads and featured work from Argentinian composer/arranger Carlos Franzetti.

Faddis also led the Dizzy Gillespie Alumni All-Stars and the Dizzy Gillespie Alumni All-Stars Big Band from their inception in 1998 through 2004, when he was appointed artistic director of the Chicago Jazz Ensemble (CJE), based at Columbia College Chicago in Illinois. Faddis led the CJE from autumn 2004 though spring 2010, premiering significant new works, pioneering educational initiatives in Chicago public schools focusing on Louis Armstrong's music, and bringing the CJE into new venues (including presenting the first of the "Made in Chicago" Jazz series at the Pritzker Pavilion in Millennium Park), while concurrently leading the Jon Faddis Jazz Orchestra of New York (the successor to the Carnegie Hall Jazz Band).

In 2006, the Jon Faddis Quartet released the CD Teranga (Koch Records, now E1), featuring guests including Clark Terry, Russell Malone, Gary Smulyan, and Frank Wess.

As of May 2010, Faddis leads the JFJONY, while continuing also to lead the Jon Faddis Quartet and the JFQ+2. The JFJONY headlined The Kennedy Center's New Year's Eve performance in December 2010 (available as a podcast on NPR's JazzSet); the JFJONY has also performed at the Kimmel Center in Philadelphia, the Performing Arts Center in Westchester, New York, the Newport Jazz Festival and other venues.

Faddis is also a noted educator for jazz and the trumpet. Faddis has taught – and continues to teach – at the Conservatory of Music at Purchase College-SUNY, in Westchester, New York, where he teaches trumpet, classes, and an ensemble. He also leads master classes, clinics and workshops around the world, often bringing students to his gigs and allowing them to sit in, and has produced a number of CDs for up-and-coming musicians.

In July 2011, he played a tribute to Miles Davis at the Prague Castle, hosted by the Czech President, Václav Klaus, accompanied by Lenny White on drums, Jaroslav Jakubovič on baritone saxophone, Tom Barney on bass and Emil Viklický on piano.

Faddis is a Schilke Performing Artist, performing on the Schilke "Faddis" model trumpet. He has played Schilke instruments since 1970, encompassing nearly his entire career and complete discography.

Family and personal life
Faddis has been a resident of Teaneck, New Jersey.

Faddis is the uncle of Madlib and Oh No, acclaimed hip-hop producers.

Discography

As leader
 1974: Jon & Billy (Trio)
 1976: Youngblood (Pablo)
 1978: Good and Plenty (Buddah)
 1985: Legacy (Concord Jazz)
 1989: Into the Faddisphere (Epic)
 1991: Hornucopia (Epic)
 1995: The Carnegie Hall Jazz Band (Blue Note)
 1997: Swing Summit: Passing the Torch, Vol. 1 (Blue Chip)
 1997: Eastwood After Hours: Live at Carnegie Hall (Malposo/Warner Bros.)
 1998: Remembrances (Chesky)
 2006: Teranga (Koch)

As sideman

With Peter Allen
 Continental American (A&M, 1974)

With Patti Austin
 The Real Me (Qwest, 1988)

With George Benson
 Body Talk (CTI, 1973)
 In Your Eyes (Warner Bros., 1983)
 20/20 (Warner Bros. 1985)
 Big Boss Band (Warner Bros., 1990)

With Anthony Braxton
 Creative Orchestra Music 1976 (Arista, 1976)

With Rusty Bryant
 Until It's Time for You to Go (Prestige, 1974)

With Kenny Burrell
 Ellington Is Forever (Fantasy, 1975)

With Michel Camilo
 One More Once (Columbia, 1994)

With Ron Carter
 Parade (Milestone, 1979)
 Empire Jazz (RSO, 1980)

With Eric Clapton
 August (Warner Bros., 1986)
 Journeyman (Reprise, 1989)

With Linda Clifford
 I'll Keep on Lovin' You (Capitol, 1982)

With Hank Crawford
 I Hear a Symphony (Kudu, 1975)

With Bo Diddley
 Big Bad Bo (Chess, 1974)

With Charles Earland
 Intensity (Prestige, 1972)
 Charles III (Prestige, 1973)
 The Dynamite Brothers (Prestige, 1973)
 Kharma (Prestige, 1974)

With Gil Evans
 Live at the Public Theater (New York 1980) (Trio, 1981)

With Jerry Fielding
 The Gauntlet (Soundtrack) (Warner Bros., 1977)

With Aretha Franklin
 Love All the Hurt Away (Arista, 1981)
 Get It Right (Arista, 1983)

With Michael Franks
 Skin Dive (Warner Bros., 1985)

With Dizzy Gillespie
 Dizzy Gillespie Jam (Pablo, 1977)
 To Diz with Love (Telarc, 1992)

As Music Director for the Dizzy Gillespie Alumni All-Stars
 Dizzy's 80th Birthday Party (Shanachie, 1997)
 Dizzy's World (Shanachie, 1999)
 Things to Come (Telarc/McG Jazz, 2002)

With Grant Green
 The Main Attraction (Kudu, 1976)
 Easy (Versatile, 1978)

With Groove Holmes 
 New Groove (Groove Merchant, 1974)

With Milt Jackson
 Bebop (East West, 1988)

With Mick Jagger
 Primitive Cool (CBS, 1987)

With Billy Joel
 An Innocent Man (Columbia, 1983)

With the Thad Jones - Mel Lewis Big Band
 Potpourri (Philadelphia International, 1974)
 Live in Munich (A&M/Horizon, 1976)

With Chaka Khan
 Destiny (Warner Bros. Records, 1986)

With Julian Lennon
 Valotte (Atlantic, 1984)

With O'Donel Levy
 Dawn of a New Day (Groove Merchant, 1973)
 Simba (Groove Merchant, 1974)

With Les McCann
 Another Beginning (Atlantic, 1974)

With Jack McDuff
 The Fourth Dimension (Cadet, 1974)

With Jimmy McGriff
 Red Beans (Groove Merchant, 1976)

With Bette Midler
 Thighs and Whispers (Atlantic, 1979)

With Charles Mingus
 Charles Mingus and Friends in Concert (Columbia, 1972)
 Mingus at Carnegie Hall (Atlantic, 1974)

With Mingus Dynasty
 Live at the Theatre Boulogne-Billancourt/Paris, Vol. 1 (Soul Note, 1988)
 Live at the Theatre Boulogne-Billancourt/Paris, Vol. 2 (Soul Note, 1988)

With Blue Mitchell
 Many Shades of Blue (Mainstream, 1974)

With David "Fathead" Newman
 Scratch My Back (Prestige, 1979)

With Jimmy Owens
 Headin' Home (A&M/Horizon, 1978)

With Jaco Pastorius
 Invitation (Warner Bros., 1983)

With Oscar Peterson
 Oscar Peterson & Jon Faddis (Pablo, 1975)

With Lou Reed
 Sally Can't Dance (RCA, 1974)
 New Sensations (RCA, 1984)

With Lalo Schifrin
 Black Widow (CTI, 1976)
 More Jazz Meets the Symphony (Atlantic, 1993)
 Firebird: Jazz Meets the Symphony No. 3 (Four Winds, 1995)
 Lalo Schifrin with WDR Big Band: Gillespiana in Cologne (Aleph, 1998)
 Latin Jazz Suite (Aleph, 1999)
 Ins and Outs and Lalo Live at the Blue Note (Aleph, 2003)

With Don Sebesky
 The Rape of El Morro (CTI, 1975)

With Marlena Shaw
 Take a Bite (Columbia, 1979)

With Carly Simon
 Hello Big Man (Warner Bros., 1983)

With Paul Simon
 Graceland (Warner Bros., 1986)

With Johnny "Hammond" Smith
 The Prophet (Kudu, 1972)
 Higher Ground (Kudu, 1973)

With Lonnie Liston Smith
 Reflections of a Golden Dream (RCA/Flying Dutchman, 1976)

With Phoebe Snow
 Against the Grain (Columbia, 1978)

With Leon Spencer
 Where I'm Coming From (Prestige, 1973)
 Something Real (Elektra, 1989)

With Candi Staton
 Candi Staton (Warner Bros., 1980)

With Jeremy Steig
 Firefly (CTI, 1977)

With Gábor Szabó
 Macho (Salvation, 1975)

With Charles Tolliver
 Impact (Strata-East, 1975)

With Tina Turner
 Love Explosion (EMI, 1979)

With Steve Turre
 The Rhythm Within (Antilles, 1995)

With Stanley Turrentine
 The Man with the Sad Face (Fantasy, 1976)
 Nightwings (Fantasy, 1977)

With Frankie Valli
 Closeup (Private Stock, 1975)

With Cedar Walton
 Beyond Mobius (RCA, 1976)

With Randy Weston
 Tanjah (Polydor, 1973)

With Gerald Wilson
 New York, New Sound (Mack Avenue, 2003)
 In My Time (Mack Avenue, 2005)
 Monterey Moods (Mack Avenue, 2007)
 Detroit (Mack Avenue, 2009)

With Tatsuro Yamashita
 Circus Town (RCA, 1976)
 Pocket Music (Moon, 1986)
 Boku No Naka No Syounen (Moon, 1988)

References

External links
 Jon Faddis Official Website

1953 births
Post-bop trumpeters
Bebop trumpeters
American jazz trumpeters
American male trumpeters
American jazz flugelhornists
American jazz composers
American male jazz composers
American session musicians
American male conductors (music)
American music educators
People from Oakland, California
People from Teaneck, New Jersey
Musicians from Oakland, California
Living people
MNRK Music Group artists
Chesky Records artists
21st-century trumpeters
Jazz musicians from California
Educators from New Jersey
Classical musicians from California
21st-century American conductors (music)
21st-century American male musicians
White Elephant Orchestra members
Mingus Dynasty (band) members
The Thad Jones/Mel Lewis Orchestra members